downhere is a Christian rock band.

Downhere may also refer to:
Downhere (1999 album), a 1999 album by Downhere
Downhere (2001 album), a rerecorded version of the 1999 album

See also
Down Here, an album by Tracy Bonham